Aretha Brown, or Aretha Stewart-Brown (born 11 November 2000), is an Indigenous Australian youth activist, comedian, artist, and the former Prime Minister of the National Indigenous Youth Parliament.

Brown has appeared doing talks, speeches and acknowledgement of country ceremonies for various organisations, including the ACTU, Landcare, Minus 18, Melbourne University, Jesuit Social Services, One Tree Foundation, Mission Australia, The Australian Shrine of Remembrance, Triple J and for the Australian College of International Surgeons.

Early life 
Brown was born in Melbourne on 11 November 2000. She is the daughter of rock frontman Paul Stewart, of the Painters and Dockers, and the contemporary Indigenous artist Donna Brown.

The family moved to the small community of Nambucca Heads in northern New South Wales to be closer to their Gumbaynggirr clan, during her early childhood. They later returned to Melbourne for Aretha's education at Williamstown High School. She commenced an Arts degree in 2019 at Melbourne University.

Art and activism 
Brown's art is inspired by her home in Melbourne's Western Suburbs and her journey as a queer teenager. Her first painting "Time is our our Side, You Mob" 2018 (shown) was selected for the 2019 Top Arts exhibition at the NGV.

The exhibition showcases young artists’ exploration of contemporary issues.

In 2014, Brown was selected to attend the 100th anniversary of the Gallipoli landings in Turkey, as the Australian State representative, acknowledging the Indigenous servicemen who fought during World War 1.

In 2017, Brown addressed an estimated 50,000 protesters in Melbourne on Australia Day at an Invasion Day rally, calling for the date of the national holiday to be changed. She has spoken at the 2018 march and other NAIDOC events and marches since then. Brown also attended the National Youth Parliament in Canberra, where she was chosen by 60 of her peers as the first female Indigenous Youth Prime Minister of Australia. In this role, she met Prime Minister Malcolm Turnbull, Opposition leader Bill Shorten and the Governor General Sir Peter Cosgrove. Tim Watts, Brown's local MP, publicly congratulated Brown in the House of Representatives for her achievements.

She has appeared on ABC Radio Melbourne, the national ABC News Breakfast program and on NITV talking about her achievements in Canberra. In 2017, Brown appeared in the ABC TV documentary Advice to My Twelve Year Old Self, about Australia's female leaders.

References

External links 
https://www.minus18.org.au/index.php/articles/item/36-interview-aretha-brown
https://www.ngv.vic.gov.au/exhibition/top-arts-2019/
https://www.thearethabrownshow.com/
http://mpavilion.org/collaborator/aretha-brown/
https://www.sbs.com.au/nitv/article/2019/01/26/not-every-indigenous-person-wants-change-date-aretha-brown

Australian indigenous rights activists
Australian Aboriginal artists
Women human rights activists
Living people
2000 births